The Mentality of Apes by Wolfgang Köhler is a landmark work in ethology, cognitive psychology and the study of the anthropoid apes. In it the author, a leading gestalt psychologist, showed that chimpanzees could solve problems by insight. The importance of this work was to show there is no absolute dividing line between the human species and their nearest living relative, at least in this respect. It was also a marker in the struggle between behaviourism and cognitive psychology which continued for the following half century. Köhler's observations and experiments were done on chimpanzees in captivity. Not until Jane Goodall's work later in the century was the behaviour of chimpanzees in the wild studied in depth.

Publication 
The book in English was preceded by important publications in German, which are listed in Henle, Mary 1971.The selected papers of Wolfgang Köhler. New York: Liveright, bibliography 438/9. The book publications are as follows:

1917. Intelligenzprüfungen an Anthropoiden. Berlin: Royal Prussian Society of Sciences.
1921. Intelligenzprüfungen an Menschenaffen. Berlin: Springer (called a 'second edition', but the first was a two-part whole issue journal publication 1918/19).
1925. The Mentality of Apes. Translated from the second revised edition by Ella Winter. London: Kegan Paul, Trench, Trubner. U.S. edition 1925 by Harcourt, Brace & World. Also included is a translation of Köhler's long 1921 paper as Some contributions to the psychology of chimpanzees. Appendix, p281342.

External links
The Mentality of Apes at the Internet Archive

Biology books
Psychology books
1925 non-fiction books